Here follows a list of notable people of Loyola University Chicago:

Academia

Prominent professors
 Pamela L. Caughie
 Vincent A. Mahler
 David Schweickart

Alumni
 Lawrence Biondi, former President of Saint Louis University
 Margaret Callahan, Dean of the College of Nursing at Marquette University
 Richard A. Cosier, Dean of the Krannert School of Management at Purdue University
Rona M. Fields, psychologist
 Christian Gostečnik, dean of Faculty of Theology of Ljubljana
 Vincent A. Mahler, prominent political scientist
 J. Dennis O'Connor, former Chancellor of University of Pittsburgh
 Robert A Wild, S.J., President of Marquette University
 Sho Yano, child prodigy

Business

Alumni
 Brenda C. Barnes, chairman and CEO, Sara Lee Corporation; first female CEO of Pepsi Cola
 Lori Greiner,  inventor, investor, entrepreneur, and television personality
 George Halas, Jr., former president/owner of the Chicago Bears
 Joseph M. Juran, quality expert
 Stephen McGowan, former CFO of Sun Microsystems
 Jennifer N. Pritzker, billionaire, and former co-owner of The Marmon Group
 Frank Considine, former CEO of  American National Can Corporation
 Michael R. Quinlan, McDonald's Corporation Chairman
 Todd Ricketts, co-owner of Chicago Cubs
 John E. Rooney, CEO of US Cellular
 Thomas Schoewe, CFO of Wal-Mart Stores, Inc.
William Scholl, founder of Dr. Scholl's footcare
Mamie Till, activist, mother of Emmett Till
 John York, co-owner of the San Francisco 49ers

Entertainment

Alumni
 Leslie David Baker, actor (The Office)
 Ian Brennan, creator of Glee
 L. Scott Caldwell, Tony Award-winning actress
 Karla DeVito, singer
 David Draiman, lead singer of Disturbed
 Wendolly Esparza, Nuestra Belleza Mexico 2014
 James Iha, The Smashing Pumpkins and A Perfect Circle guitarist
 Richard Kiley, Emmy-winning actor, singer and narrator (attended)
 Tim McCoy, cowboy actor
 Jennifer Morrison, actress (House M.D., Once Upon a Time)
 Joel Murray, actor
 Bob Newhart, Peabody Award-winning actor and comedian, The Bob Newhart Show and Newhart
 Jim O'Heir, actor (Parks and Recreation)
 David Pasquesi, actor
 Bill Rancic, television personality
 Sosay, professional wrestler

Government and politics

Alumni

Activists
 Jerry Harkness, former professional basketball player and civil rights activist
 Jerome G. Miller, advocate for alternatives to incarceration and the deinstitutionalization of persons with developmental disabilities
 Mary Morello, progressive activist
 Michael Pfleger, Roman Catholic priest and social activist

Attorneys
 Anita Alvarez, former Cook County State's Attorney
 Richard A. Devine, former Cook County State's Attorney
 Neil F. Hartigan, former Illinois Attorney General, candidate for Governor, former Lt. Governor
 Donald Lee Hollowell, civil rights attorney
 Lisa Madigan, Illinois Attorney General
 Dan K. Webb, Chairman of Winston & Strawn LLP

Cabinet members
 William M. Daley, President Obama's White House Chief of Staff and former United States Secretary of Commerce under President Bill Clinton
 Susan Ralston, former White House Deputy Chief of Staff and Senior Advisor

Judges
 William Joseph Campbell, chief judge, United States District Court for the Northern District of Illinois
 Ruben Castillo, judge, United States District Court for the Northern District of Illinois
 David H. Coar, judge, United States District Court for the Northern District of Illinois
 John W. Darrah, judge, United States District Court for the Northern District of Illinois
 Thomas R. Fitzgerald, 1st District Justice Supreme Court of Illinois
 Lee M. Jackwig, United States Bankruptcy Judge in the United States District Court for the Southern District of Iowa
 Virginia Mary Kendall, judge, United States District Court for the Northern District of Illinois
 Howard Thomas Markey, the first Chief Justice of the United States Court of Appeals for the Federal Circuit
 Peg McDonnell Breslin, member of the Illinois House of Representatives from 1977 to 1991 and the first woman elected to the Illinois Appellate Court outside of Cook County.
 Mary Ann G. McMorrow, former Chief Justice of the Supreme Court of Illinois
 Mary Jane Theis, judge, Supreme Court of Illinois
 Robert R. Thomas, current Chief Justice of the Supreme Court of Illinois

Legislators
 Harry P. Beam, former U.S. Congressman
 Charles A. Boyle, former U.S. Congressman
 Emmet Byrne, former U.S. Congressman
 Fred Crespo, member of Illinois House of Representatives
 Daniel Cronin, former Illinois State Senator
 John Cullerton, current Illinois State Senator; President of Illinois State Senate
 Tom Dart, Cook County Sheriff and former Illinois State Representative
 Ed Derwinski, former U.S. Congressman, 1st United States Secretary of Veterans Affairs
 Michael Dvorak, former Indiana state representative and St. Joseph County, Indiana Prosecutor
 Samuel Epstein, Illinois state representative, lawyer, and physician
 John N. Erlenborn, former U.S. Congressman
 John G. Fary, former U.S. Congressman
 Edward Rowan Finnegan, former U.S. Congressman
 Michael Patrick Flanagan, former U.S. Congressman
 La Shawn Ford, current member of Illinois House of Representatives
 John J. Gorman, former U.S. Congressman
 Mary Jeanne Hallstrom, former member of Illinois House of Representatives
 Shawn Hamerlinck, former Iowa State Senator
 Henry Hyde, former U.S. Congressman
 Daniel Hynes, current Illinois State Comptroller
 James T. Igoe, former U.S. Congressman
 Peter C. Knudson, current Utah State Senator
 Gary LaPaille, former Illinois State Senator
 Michael Madigan, current Speaker of the Illinois House of Representatives and chairman of the Democratic Party of Illinois
 William T. Murphy, former U.S. Congressman
 Thomas L. Owens, former U.S. Congressman
 Lillian Piotrowski, former Illinois State Representative
 Mike Quigley, current U.S. Congressman
 Trey Radel, former U.S. Congressman
 Christine Radogno, former Illinois State Senator; former Republican Minority Leader in the Illinois State Senate
 Daniel J. Ronan, former U.S. Congressman
 Dan Rostenkowski, former U.S. Congressman
 Martin Sandoval, current Illinois State Senator
 Ira Silverstein, current Illinois State Senator
 James M. Slattery, former U.S. Senator
 Rudolph G. Tenerowicz, former U.S. Congressman
 Donne Trotter, former Illinois State Senator
 Arthur Wilhelmi, former Illinois State Senator
 Corinne Wood, former Illinois Lieutenant Governor

Other
 Lieutenant General Joseph Carroll, founding director of Defense Intelligence Agency and the Air Force Office of Special Investigations
 Major General Enrique Méndez, Jr., Army Deputy Surgeon General
 Nina Kasniunas, Political scientist, author, and professor
 Maria Pappas, Cook County Treasurer (1998–present). Pappas earned her Ph.D. in psychology from Loyola in 1976.
 Todd Ricketts, Finance Chairman of the Republican National Committee since January 31, 2018
 Edith S. Sampson, US delegate to the United Nations

Journalism

Alumni
 Susan Candiotti, CNN correspondent
 Philip Caputo, author, Pulitzer Prize-winning journalist
 Susan Carlson, WBBM-TV Chicago news anchor
 Shams Charania, sports journalist covering the NBA for The Athletic and Stadium
 Robert Jordan, WGN-TV weekend news anchor
 Christina Kahrl, co-founder of Baseball Prospectus, writer for ESPN.com
 Ernie Manouse, TV anchor and producer, PBS
 Bill Plante, CBS White House correspondent
 Jim Quinlan, credited with the story and screenplay for Michael (1996 film)
 Victoria Recano, news anchor
 Mercedes Soler, news anchor for Univision and CNN en Español
 Patricia Thompson, TV and film producer

Literature

Alumni
 Sandra Cisneros (b. 1954), author, poet, teacher
 Stuart Dybek, author
 James McManus, author
 John R. Powers, novelist and playwright; author of Do Black Patent Leather Shoes Really Reflect Up?
 Daniel Quinn, author
 Dinesh Sharma, author

Medical

Alumni
 John L. Keeley Sr., Chicago surgeon who was personal physician to two Chicago cardinals
 Bruce Lerman, cardiologist; Chief of the Division of Cardiology and Director of the Cardiac Electrophysiology Laboratory at Weill Cornell Medicine and the New York Presbyterian Hospital
 Charlie Pechous, Major League Baseball player and physician

Religion
 Mark McIntosh, Professor of Christian Spirituality
 Sister Jean Dolores Schmidt, current chaplain of the men's basketball team who became a major media celebrity during the team's 2018 Final Four run

Alumni
 Daniel Coughlin, chaplain of the United States House of Representatives
 Norman Geisler, president of Southern Evangelical Seminary in Charlotte, North Carolina
 Roger William Gries, auxiliary bishop of Cleveland
 Daniel A. Lord, Catholic writer
 Anthony Petro Mayalla, Archbishop of the Roman Catholic Archdiocese of Mwanza
 Vincent Nichols, Archbishop of Westminster and ‘Primate of England and Wales’ (see Archbishop of Westminster for explanation)
 John George Vlazny, Archbishop of Portland, Oregon
 Mar Awa Royel, Catholicos-Patriarch of the Assyrian Church of the East

Sports

Alumni
 Elliot Collier, professional soccer player
 Clayton Custer, professional basketball player and coach
 Donte Ingram, NBA player for the Dallas Mavericks
 Milton Doyle, NBA player for the Brooklyn Nets
 Jack Dwan, former professional basketball player
 John Egan, basketball player
 Armando Favela, professional golfer
 Eric Gehrig, professional soccer player
 Thomas Jaeschke, professional and U.S. Olympic men's volleyball player
 Jerry Harkness, former professional basketball player
 Alfredrick Hughes, former professional basketball player (1st round pick in 1985 NBA Draft)
 Les Hunter, former professional basketball player
 Jack Kerris, former professional basketball player
 Nick Kladis, former professional basketball player, part-owner of White Sox and St. Louis Cardinals
 Cameron Krutwig, professional basketball player
 LaRue Martin, former professional basketball player (# 1 pick in 1972 NBA Draft)
 Andre Moore, former professional basketball player
 Mike Novak, former professional basketball player
 Tom O'Hara, former indoor mile world record holder, 1964 Olympian
 Mickey Rottner, former professional basketball player
 Vic Rouse, basketball player, made game-winning shot to give Loyola 1963 NCAA championship
 Lenny Sachs, Hall of Fame basketball coach
 Blake Schilb, professional basketball player
 Eddie Slowikowski, former NCAA All-American runner
 Andre Wakefield, former professional basketball player
 Phil Weintraub, Major League Baseball player
 Brian Wheeler, broadcaster for NBA's Portland Trail Blazers

Notes and references

Loyola University Chicago people

Loyola University Chicago people